Nestlé Crisp is a line of wafer candy bars that are based on existing Nestlé brands and sold in the United States.  There are currently three Crisp bars in production: the Butterfinger Crisp, the Baby Ruth Crisp and the Nestlé Crunch Crisp.  Each package is made up of two small, individual bars.

The Crisp line is an offshoot of the original Butterfinger Crisp that came out in 2004, then later a Nestlé Crunch Crisp and finally the Baby Ruth Crisp.  While the original Butterfinger and Nestlé Crunch Crisp were full-size candy bars, all the current Crisps follow the two small, individual bar packaging.

See also 
 Coffee Crisp—a different "Crisp" candy bar by Nestlé, sold in Canada

External links
 Candy Blog (original) Butterfinger Crisp review
 Candy Blog (original) Nestlé Crunch Crisp review
 Candy Blog current Crisp line review

Brand name confectionery
Chocolate bars
Nestlé brands
2004 establishments in the United States
Products introduced in 2004